The tennis competition at the 2010 Central American and Caribbean Games was held in Mayagüez, Puerto Rico.

The tournament was scheduled to be held from 26 to 31 July at the Mayagüez University Campus Tennis Courts in Mayagüez.

Medal summary

Men's events

Women's events

Mixed event

Medal table

Men's singles

Seeds

Draw

Finals

Top Half

Bottom Half

Men's doubles

Women's events

Women's singles

Women's doubles

Mixed doubles

Seeds

Draw

References

External links

Central American and Caribbean Games
July 2010 sports events in North America
Events at the 2010 Central American and Caribbean Games
2010